The Turn of a Friendly Card is the fifth studio album by the British progressive rock band The Alan Parsons Project, released in 1980 by Arista Records. The title piece, which appears on side 2 of the LP, is a 16-minute suite broken up into five tracks. The Turn of a Friendly Card spawned the hits "Games People Play" and "Time", the latter of which was Eric Woolfson's first lead vocal appearance. An edited version of the title piece combining the opening and ending parts of the suite was also released as a single along with an official video.

As other band's albums, The Turn of a Friendly Card is a Concept album with its theme focused on the gambling industry and the fate of gamblers, with more than one reference to Las Vegas (e.g. "there's a sign in the desert that lies to west" from the title piece). Musically it's a more melodic and accessible album than its predecessors.
   
Up to this album, all Alan Parsons Project albums had been packaged in gatefold sleeves. Increasing budgetary constraints of record companies made The Turn of a Friendly Card the beginning of all subsequently released Alan Parsons Project albums to be single-sleeve packaged.
 
The album was recorded in a record short time of two weeks in Paris. Usually the Alan Parsons Project would take many months to record an album.

Track listing
All songs written and composed by Alan Parsons and Eric Woolfson.

Though numbered as a single work, "The Turn of a Friendly Card" is split into five tracks on most compact disc and all digital and streaming releases.

Bonus tracks (2008 remaster)
The Turn of a Friendly Card was remastered and reissued in 2008 with the following bonus tracks:

"May Be a Price to Pay" (Intro/demo) 1:32
"Nothing Left to Lose" (Basic backing track) 4:36
"Nothing Left to Lose" (Chris Rainbow overdub compilation) 2:02
"Nothing Left to Lose" (Early studio version with Woolfson's guide vocal) 3:11
"Time" (Early studio attempt) 4:42
"Games People Play" (Rough mix) 4:33
"The Gold Bug" (Demo) 2:50

 "The Gold Bug" (Demo) was named after an Edgar Allan Poe short story. The main keyboard sound is a Hohner Clavinet with damaged strings and a repeat echo. This was also used for the final album version. The short duration of the notes made it difficult to get in tune.

Deluxe Edition (2015)
In 2015, a "deluxe anniversary edition" was released on double CD. This featured a new remaster of the album, the bonus tracks of the 2008 edition on disc 1 and an additional disc including excerpts from Eric Woolfson's songwriting demos, rough mixes and the three single edits. On this new remaster, Parsons corrected a persisting speed mistake which was present in all earlier CD editions, from the very first (1987) up to the 2008 remaster, caused by the original master tape running slow during the CD mastering process and thus altering the pitch of the entire recording.

"Eric's Songwriting Demos"
"May Be a Price to Pay" 3:26
"Games People Play" 3:06
"Time" 4:06
"I Don't Wanna Go Home" 2:12
"The Turn of a Friendly Card" 3:19
"Snake Eyes" 3:13
"Nothing Left to Lose" 2:46
"TOFC / Snake Eyes / I Don't Wanna Go Home" 4:32
"Extra Bonus Tracks"
"May Be a Price to Pay (Early version – Eric Guide Vocal & Unused Guitar Solo)" 5:03
"Games People Play (Early Version – Eric Guide vocal)" 4:32
"Time (Orchestra & Chris Rainbow Backing vocals)" 4:19
"The Gold Bug (Early Reference Version)" 5:08
"The Turn of a Friendly Card Part One (Early Backing Track)" 2:18
"Snake Eyes (Early Version – Eric Guide Vocal)" 3:20
"The Ace of Swords (Early Version With Synth "Orchestration")" 3:03
"The Ace of Swords (Early Version With Piano on Melody)" 2:40
"The Turn of a Friendly Card Part Two (Eric Guide Vocal And Extended Guitar Solo)" 3:32
"Single Edits"
"Games People Play" 3:35
"The Turn of a Friendly Card" 3:44
"Snake Eyes" 2:26

Personnel
Stuart Elliott – drums, percussion
David Paton – bass guitar
Ian Bairnson – electric, acoustic and classical guitars; pedal steel guitar on "Time"
Eric Woolfson – piano, harpsichord, lead vocals
Alan Parsons – Projectron on "Games People Play", whistling and finger snaps on "The Gold Bug", Clavinet on "The Gold Bug" and "The Ace of Swords", harpsichord on "The Ace of Swords", additional vocals on "Time"
Chris Rainbow – lead and backing vocals
Elmer Gantry (Dave Terry) – lead vocal
Lenny Zakatek – lead and backing vocals
The Philharmonia Orchestra, arranged and conducted by Andrew Powell

Produced and engineered by Alan Parsons
Executive producer: Eric Woolfson
Mastering consultant: Chris Blair
Sleeve concept: Lol Creme and Kevin Godley
Ted Jensen Original LP UK & US Pressings.

Additional instrumentation
"The Gold Bug", which references the same-titled short story by Edgar Allan Poe, includes a whistling part by Parsons (in the style of Ennio Morricone's early themes for Sergio Leone's Spaghetti Western films, such as A Fistful of Dollars) and wordless vocals by Rainbow, while the main theme is played on an alto saxophone. The saxophone player, originally credited as Mel Collins, is instead credited on the liner notes for the remastered edition as "A session player in Paris whose name escapes us"; this refers to the fact that the saxophone part is a composite of several separate takes. Similarly, the accordion part on "Nothing Left to Lose" is credited in the liner notes to "An unidentified Parisian session player". Also on "The Gold Bug", the newer liner notes credit a "Harmonized Rotating Triangle" to drummer Stuart Elliott. This refers to the phasing sound effects heard throughout the rhythm-free introduction to the piece.

Charts

Weekly charts

Year-end charts

Certifications and sales

Covers
The album's title track was covered by German funeral doom metal band Ahab for their album The Boats of the "Glen Carrig" in 2015.

Notes

The Alan Parsons Project albums
1980 albums
Albums produced by Alan Parsons
Arista Records albums